Thomas Law Hodges (1776 – 14 May 1857) was an English Whig Party politician who sat in the House of Commons variously between 1830 and 1852.

Hodges was the son of Thomas Hallet Hodges of Hemsted Park in Kent and his wife Dorothy Cartwright, daughter of William Cartwright of Marnham Hall Nottinghamshire. He was  a Deputy Lieutenant for Kent, a J.P.  for Kent and Sussex and chairman of the quarter sessions. He was a major in the West Kent Militia. 
 
At the 1830 general election, Hodges was elected as a Member of Parliament (MP) for Kent.  He was re-elected in 1831, and held the seat until it was divided under the Great Reform Act in 1832. At the 1832 general election he was elected as an MP for West Kent, holding that seat until 1841, when two Conservative Party candidates were elected unopposed. He was returned for West Kent at a contested election in 1847 and held the seat until his defeat at the 1852 general election.

Hodges lived at  Hemsted Place, Cranbrook, Kent, and died at the age of 80.

Hodges married Rebecca Twisden, daughter of Sir Roger Twisden, Bt in 1802.  His son Thomas Twisden Hodges was also a politician.

References

External links

Tate Collection - Portrait by Sir William Beechey

1776 births
1857 deaths
UK MPs 1830–1831
UK MPs 1831–1832
UK MPs 1832–1835
UK MPs 1835–1837
UK MPs 1837–1841
UK MPs 1847–1852
Deputy Lieutenants of Kent
Whig (British political party) MPs for English constituencies